Hanna Carina Granitzki (born 31 July 1997) is a German field hockey player.

Career

Club Hockey
Hanna Granitzki plays club hockey for Club an der Alster, based in Hamburg, Germany.

National Teams

Junior
In 2016, Granitzki played in the Junior World Cup in Santiago, Chile, where the team finished 5th.

Senior
Granitzki made her senior international debut at the 2017 Four Nations Cup in Berlin.

Since her debut, Granitzki has been a regular inclusion in the German national side. Her most notable appearance for the team was during the inaugural FIH Pro League in 2019, where the team won bronze.

International Goals

References

External links

1997 births
Living people
German female field hockey players
Place of birth missing (living people)
Female field hockey defenders
Der Club an der Alster players
Feldhockey Bundesliga (Women's field hockey) players
Field hockey players at the 2020 Summer Olympics
Olympic field hockey players of Germany
21st-century German women